Pulau Biola (or Violin Island) is a small 0.4-hectare island located off the southwestern coast of Singapore, between Pulau Senang to its north and Pulau Satumu to its south. It is one of the famous diving spot in Singapore, and it has wide variety of corals and other marine organisms.

Panoramic image

References

External links
Satellite image of Violin Island - Google Maps

Biola
Western Islands Planning Area